The Handshake Murders were a metalcore band from Fort Smith, Arkansas. The band includes many members from Eso-Charis and Norma Jean. When Eso-Charis, disbanded, Holmes made The Handshake Murders full-time. The band has released one full-length album, and two EPs. The band has been compared to Coalesce, Meshuggah, and A Life Once Lost and have gone on tour with bands such as The Chariot, Norma Jean, and Darkest Hour. After 10 years of being active, the band broke-up.

Members

 Jayson Holmes - vocals (ex-Eso-Charis) (2000-2011) (deceased 2022)
 Brian Evans - guitar (2000-2011)
 John Ridenour - guitar (2000-2007)
 Cory Brandan Putman - guitar (ex-Eso-Charis, ex-Living Sacrifice, Norma Jean)
 Jeremy Joplin - guitar (2007)
 Bryce Lucien - guitar (2007-2011)
 Jeff Hickey - guitar, bass (Norma Jean) (2000-2007)
 Brandon Rogers - guitar, bass (2009-2011)
 Keith Baskett - bass (2007-2009)
 Daniel "Dan" Wiggins - drums (2000-2007)
 Jeff King - drums (2007-2011)

Discography
Studio albums
 Usurper (2007)
EPs
 Bury the Effigy (2002)
 Essays in the Progression of Man (2005)
Compilation Appearances
 "Messenger" on End Times, released through Goodfellow Records

References

Metalcore musical groups from Arkansas
Musical groups established in 2000
American Christian metal musical groups
Musical groups disestablished in 2011